Sapai Glai Peun Tiang (Underdeveloped Daughter-in Law) is a Thai drama produced by Channel 3 and stars Chakrit Yamnam and Ann Thongprasom.

Synopsis
Sapai Glai Peun Tiang revolves around a hot-headed cop named Lalin (Ann Thongprasom)

Cast
Chakrit Yamnam as Jormtup
Ann Thongprasom as Lalin/Prik
Akkaphan Namart as Pat
Kanya Rattanapetch as Nampetch
Chintara Sukapatana

References

Categories

Thai television soap operas